Flowgrind is a testing and benchmarking tool to measure throughput and other metrics for TCP.
It was originally developed to study performance and behavior of TCP variants within Wireless mesh networks.

In contrast to similar tools like Iperf or Netperf it features a distributed architecture, where throughput and other
metrics are measured between flowgrind server processes. The Flowgrind client has
the purpose to schedule such measurements and collect the measurement data.

Inherent with this architecture and its designation for Wireless mesh networks flowgrind supports:
 separation of measured traffic and control traffic (e.g., to measure the wireless performance, but don't let the control traffic interfere),
 a simultaneous measurement between any number of hosts running the flowgrind server (e.g., to create wireless crosstalk),
 uni-directional, bi-directional or sophisticated request/response tests (e.g., to simulate various usage scenarios and protocols) and
 packet capture support (e.g., for offline in-depth traffic analysis).

Flowgrind allows the user to set various protocol parameters (e.g. the Congestion control algorithm) individually for each connection. This can be used to explore how certain settings affect network utilization and how they may compete which each other.

Unlike most cross-platform testing tools, besides application layer
metrics, Flowgrind can output some transport layer metrics, which are
usually internal to the TCP/IP Stack. For example, on Linux this includes
the kernel's estimation of the end-to-end round-trip
time and the size of the congestion window.

See also
 Iperf, Netperf, Ttcp, bwping: tools of a similar nature.
 Measuring network throughput
 Packet generation model

References

External links
 Flowgrind Homepage
 Flowgrind at GitHub

Network performance